is a Japanese voice actress from Aichi Prefecture, Japan. She is affiliated with I'm Enterprise. Her notable animation roles include Kanna Kamui in Miss Kobayashi's Dragon Maid, Komekko in KonoSuba, and Platelet in Cells at Work!.

Biography

Filmography

TV Anime
Onegai My Melody  (2005), Harumi
 Chibi Miku-San!:The Animation (2008), Akita Neru
 Mayoi Neko Overrun! (2010), Fumino Serizawa (Child)
Invaders of the Rokujyōma!? (2014), Theiamillis "Theia" Gre Fortorthe
Ani Tore! EX (2015), Shion Tachibana
Komori-san Can't Decline (2015), Masako Negishi
Magical Somera-chan (2015), Ai Matsushima
Ani Tore!! XX (2016), Shion Tachibana
Divine Gate (2016), Ruri
Kiitarō Shōnen no Yōkai Enikki (2016), Yuki Musume
Magic of Stella (2016), Tamaki Honda
Occultic;Nine (2016), Chizu Kawabata
Pandora in the Crimson Shell: Ghost Urn (2016), Amy Gilliam
Undefeated Bahamut Chronicle (2016), La Krusche
Miss Kobayashi's Dragon Maid (2017), Kanna Kamui
KonoSuba 2 (2017), Komekko
Two Car (2017), Tsugami Nakajima
Slow Start (2018), Kamuri Sengoku
Cells at Work! (2018-21), Platelet
Sword Gai: The Animation (2018), Rie Matoba
Wasteful Days of High School Girls (2019), Saku "Loli" Momoi
Azur Lane (2019), USS Laffey
Z/X Code reunion (2019), Matoi Shinonome
BNA: Brand New Animal (2020), Nazuna Hiwatashi
Magatsu Wahrheit -Zuerst- (2020), Ilma
Back Arrow (2021), Sam
Yatogame-chan Kansatsu Nikki 3 Satsume (2021), Serura Dobe
Azur Lane Bisoku Zenshin! (2021), USS Laffey
The Detective Is Already Dead (2021), Alicia
Miss Kobayashi's Dragon Maid S (2021), Kanna Kamui
Estab Life: Great Escape (2022), Maruteese
In the Heart of Kunoichi Tsubaki (2022), Kibushi
Don't Hurt Me, My Healer! (2022), Celia
Parallel World Pharmacy (2022), Blanche de Médicis
A Galaxy Next Door (2023), Fumio Kuga
KonoSuba: An Explosion on This Wonderful World! (2023), Komekko
World Dai Star (2023), Yae Niizuma

Anime Film
Colorful Ninja Iromaki (2016), Midorimaki
Laidbackers (2019), Ran (Valvaran)
KonoSuba: God's Blessing on this Wonderful World! Legend of Crimson (2019), Komekko
High School Fleet: The Movie (2020), Shia "Nomu" Nomura

Web Anime
Monster Strike (2017), Daikokuten (Femele)

Video Games
Tokyo 7th Sisters (2014), Saeki Hina
Kaden Shōjo (2015), Ramu, Neiro
Chrome Magna (2015), Miyuki
Alternative Girls (2017), Miyuki Usui
Grand Chase Dimensional Chaser (2017), Scarde Vi Serdin
Lydie & Soeur no Atelier: Fushigi na Kaiga no Renkinjutsushi (2017), Lydie Marlen
Azur Lane (2017), USS Laffey
Yuki Yuna is a Hero: A Sparkling Flower, Mito Fujimori
Magia Record (2018), Mito Aino
Onsen Musume: Yunohana Collection (2018), Koyuki Ginzan
Master of Eternity (2018) as April
O.N.G.E.K.I (2018), Arisu Suzushima
Sdorica -Mirage- (2019), Misa
Browndust (2019) as Anastasia
Dragalia Lost (2019), Lathna
Gunvolt Chronicles: Luminous Avenger iX (2019), Maria
The King of Fighters All Star (2019), Pretty Chang
Mahjong Soul (2019), Yuzu
Punishing: Gray Raven (2019), Pulao
Arknights (2020) as Weedy
Girls' Frontline (2021) Sig MCX and Savage 99
Dead or Alive Xtreme Venus Vacation (2021) Koharu
Blue Archive (2021), Natsu Yutori
Girl Cafe Gun (2021), Aniya Jung
Granblue Fantasy (2021), Wamdus 
Alchemy Stars (2022), Kanna Kamui
Fate/Grand Order (2022), Mary Anning
The Legend of Heroes: Kuro no Kiseki II -CRIMSON SiN- (2022), Mare

Dubbing
 My Spy, Sophie
Miraculous: Tales of Ladybug & Cat Noir – Tikki

References

External links
 Official agency profile 
 

1995 births
Living people
I'm Enterprise voice actors
Japanese video game actresses
Japanese voice actresses
Voice actresses from Aichi Prefecture
21st-century Japanese actresses